Çağlar Söyüncü (born 23 May 1996) is a Turkish professional footballer who plays as a defender for Premier League club Leicester City and the Turkey national team.

Söyüncü's first senior professional team was the Turkish second division Altınordu. In the summer of 2016, he joined SC Freiburg of Germany's Bundesliga, before moving to Leicester City in 2018. He made his senior national team debut in 2016.

Club career

Altınordu
Söyüncü began his senior professional career with Altınordu in the TFF First League, the second level of the Turkish football league system. During the 2015–16 season with Altınordu, Söyüncü was linked with Beşiktaş J.K., Galatasaray S.K. and Sevilla FC but the 20 year old Turkish national player selected the Bundesliga because he thought it was better choice for his career and his improvement

SC Freiburg
On 24 May 2016, in the 2016 Bundesliga summer transfer window, Söyüncü joined German side SC Freiburg, which was promoted to the top flight competition of Germany for the 2016–17 season. He is the first Turkish footballer who made a transfer to the Bundesliga directly from the TFF First League, the second-highest professional level football league of Turkey.

He made his Bundesliga debut on week 1 encounter away against Hertha Berlin which ended in a 2–1 loss, on 28 August 2016. He was linked with Lille OSC, A.S. Roma, and Villarreal CF during the mid-season transfer window of the 2016–17 season. Manchester City was also reported to be interested in Söyüncü.

Leicester City
On 9 August 2018, Söyüncü joined English Premier League side Leicester City on a five-year contract. He signed for an apparent £18 million transfer fee, possibly rising to £20 million with add-ons. Söyüncü had his Premier League debut on 27 October 2018 at the King Power Stadium where Leicester shared points with West Ham United following the final score of 1–1.

Söyüncü scored his first Premier League goal in Leicester's 11th game of the 2019–20 season on 3 November 2019 against Crystal Palace at Selhurst Park, a 2–0 win. On 11 May 2021, he scored the winning goal for Leicester City in a 2–1 away victory over Manchester United, to be their first win at Old Trafford since 1998.

International career
In November 2015, he was called up to Turkey national football team by coach Fatih Terim, following the injury of central defender Serdar Aziz. Söyüncü is the first Altınordu player called up to Turkey national football team after 78 years, since Sait Altınordu, the iconic player of the club, was selected in 1937. He is also the first player called up to national team from any İzmir-based football clubs since 1997. On 17 November 2015, Söyüncü was a reserve for the friendly game against Greece, but stayed on the bench and did not actually get a chance to play. On 18 March 2016, he was called to national squad for friendly games against Sweden and Austria, to be held on 24 March 2016 in Antalya, Turkey and on 29 March in Austria, respectively.

Substituting for Ozan Tufan in the dying minutes of a friendly game against Sweden, Söyüncü earned his first senior national team cap on 24 March 2016. Earning his second cap, he was in the starting line-up in the friendly with Russia on 1 September 2016, which ended 0–0.

On 1 June 2018, Söyüncü scored his first senior international goal on a friendly game against Tunisia, held at Stade de Genève, Geneva, Switzerland.

Style of play and reception
Possessing leadership attributes, Söyüncü is good at playmaking, dribbling and timing. In 2016, he stated that his idol is Spanish defender Carles Puyol and he admires German international Mats Hummels.

Former English international and current pundit Martin Keown analysed Söyüncü for BBC Sport in 2019, describing him "a defender made for the modern game", highlighting his agility, aggressiveness and heading attributes.

His popularity and uncanny resemblance to the character in the movie Shrek, led him to be nicknamed by fans as "Lord Farquaad".

Career statistics

Club
.

International

Scores and results list Turkey's goal tally first.

Honours
Leicester City
FA Cup: 2020–21
FA Community Shield: 2021

Individual
Turkish Footballer of the Year: 2019
PFA Team of the Year: 2019–20 Premier League

References

External links

Profile at the Leicester City F.C. website
Profile at the Turkish Football Federation website 

1996 births
Living people
Footballers from İzmir
Turkish footballers
Turkey youth international footballers
Turkey under-21 international footballers
Turkey international footballers
Association football defenders
Altınordu F.K. players
SC Freiburg players
Leicester City F.C. players
TFF First League players
Bundesliga players
Premier League players
FA Cup Final players
UEFA Euro 2020 players
Turkish expatriate footballers
Expatriate footballers in England
Expatriate footballers in Germany
Turkish expatriate sportspeople in England
Turkish expatriate sportspeople in Germany